Netto is a French discount supermarket chain owned by the Les Mousquetaires group. Previously known as Comptoir des Marchands, the chain changed its name to Netto in 2001. As of 2005 there are over 360 Netto stores in France and Portugal.

This chain of stores is neither owned nor affiliated with the Netto owned by the Danish Salling Group or the Netto owned by the German Edeka Group.

Les Mousquetaires family 

Netto is controlled by the Les Mousquetaires family, owners of the supermarket chain Intermarché. 'Les Mousquetaires' have created a number of companies:
 Intermarché (Supermarket)
 Bricomarché (DIY Shops)
 Restaumarché (Restaurants)
 Ecomarché

See also

 List of French companies
 List of supermarket chains in France

References
Information regarding Netto in France (French)

External links
French Netto homepage

Retail companies established in 1961
Retail companies of France
Supermarkets of France
Supermarkets of Poland